N.J. Yasaswy was a finance and investment writer and a  founding member of ICFAI University.

Biography

Yasaswy was appointed by the Government of Andhra Pradesh as Chairman, Andhra Pradesh State Trading Corporation (1985–88) and Vice-Chairman, Public Enterprises Management Board (1986–88). He was a member of the SEBI Committee on Accounting Standards. He was a Member of the Board of Directors of the Association of Certified International Investment Analysts (ACIIA), Switzerland. Yasaswy annually offered post-Budget analysis sessions. He was nominated to be a member on SEBI Committee on Accounting Standards. Yasaswy was a member of the Board of Governors of the ICFAI University. He authored books on finance and investments.

He died on October 8, 2011, of a brain haemorrhage. He was survived by his wife, a son and a daughter and mother.

Awards 
He received the Basu Foundation Award and won Student of the Year from both the Institute of Cost and Works Accountants of India (in 1972) and the Institute of Chartered Accountants of India (in 1973).

Books 
 Finance and Profits - Vision Books
 Intelligent Stock Market Investing - Vision Books
 Personal Investment and Tax Planning - Vision Books

References

External links

External links 
ICFAI University
Books

Indian financial writers
1950 births
Indian educators
2011 deaths